The Yokosuka P1Y Ginga (銀河, "Galaxy") was a twin-engine, land-based bomber developed for the Japanese Imperial Navy in World War II. It was the successor to the Mitsubishi G4M and given the Allied reporting name "Frances".

Design and development
The P1Y was designed by the Yokosuka Naval Air Technical Arsenal to Navy specification 15-Shi, calling for a fast bomber with speed matching the Zero, range matching the G4M, a 907 kg (2,000 lb) bombload, and the ability to dive-bomb as well as carry torpedoes. As the result, the construction suffered from excess complexity, difficulty of manufacture, and poor serviceability. Problems with the availability of enough reliable Nakajima Homare engines led to their replacement by the Mitsubishi Kasei in the P1Y2-S night-fighter version.

The streamlined design of the Ginga is attributed to Miki Tadanao, an engineer who after World War II went on to create a similar aerodynamic design for Japan's earliest bullet trains (Shinkansen), while working with the Japan National Railways (JNR).

Operational history

The first flight was in August 1943. Nakajima manufactured 1,002 examples, which were operated by five Kōkūtai (Air Groups), and acted as land-based medium and torpedo bombers from airfields in China, Taiwan, the Mariana Islands, the Philippines, the Ryukyu Islands, Shikoku, and Kyūshū. During the last stages of the war the P1Y was used as a kamikaze aircraft against the United States Navy during the Okinawa Campaign in Operation Tan No. 2.

A night fighter version, the P1Y2-S Kyokko (極光, "Aurora"), with Mitsubishi Kasei engines, was equipped with radar and Schräge Musik-style upward-firing as well as forward-firing 20 mm cannon. A total of 96 were produced by Kawanishi, but due to inadequate high-altitude performance against the B-29 Superfortress, many were converted back to Ginga bombers.

Survivors
A P1Y1 survives at the Smithsonian's Paul Garber Facility of its National Air and Space Museum. While only the fuselage has been photographed several times and can be found on the internet, the wings and engines are confirmed to exist. This was one of three P1Ys that were brought back to the United States after World War II for evaluation.

Variants

P1Y1 Experimental Type 15 land-based bomber (15試陸上爆撃機, 15-Shi Rikujō Bakugekiki)
 3 of prototypes and 9 of supplementary prototypes with 1,357 kW (1,820 hp) NK9C Nakajima NK9B Homare 11 engines. Prototype #3 was later used for Ishikawajima Tsu-11 testbed.

P1Y1 Ginga ("Milky Way") Model 11 (銀河11型, Ginga 11-gata)
 First model of the series. Mounted Homare 11 or Homare 12.
P1Y1a Ginga Model 11A (銀河11甲型, Ginga 11 Kō-gata)
 Mounted Homare 12, and fitted 1 × 13 mm (.51 in) Type 2 machine gun in the back defensive position.
P1Y1b Provisional name Ginga Model 11B (仮称銀河11乙型, Kashō Ginga 11 Otsu-gata)
 Converted from P1Y1a, mounted Homare 12, and fitted 2 × 13 mm (.51 in) Type 2 machine guns in the back defensive position.
P1Y1c Provisional name Ginga Model 11C (仮称銀河11丙型, Kashō Ginga 11 Hei-gata)
 Converted from P1Y1b, mounted Homare 12, and fitted 1 × 13 mm (.51 in) Type 2 machine gun in the forward position, prototype only.
P1Y1 Ginga Model 11 Night-fighter variant (銀河11型改造夜戦, Ginga 11-gata Kaizō yasen)
 Converted from P1Y1. Armed with 2 × 20 mm Type 99 cannons. Equipped 302nd Kōkūtai only. This is not a naval regulation equipment.
P1Y1-S Provisional name Ginga Model 21 (仮称銀河21型, Kashō Ginga 21-gata)
 Night fighter variant. Armed with 4 × 20 mm Type 99 cannons firing obliquely forward, and 1 × 13 mm (.51 in) Type 2 machine gun in the back defensive position. Only a project.
P1Y1 Ground attack variant
 Converted from P1Y1/P1Y1a, installed up to 20 × 20 mm Type 99 cannons in the bomb bay for land strikes against B-29 bases in the Marianas. Approx. 30 rebuilt.
P1Y2-S Provisional name Ginga Model 26/Test production Kyokkō ("Aurora") (仮称銀河26型/試製極光, Kashō Ginga 26-gata/Shisei Kyokkō)
 Night fighter variant. Initial named Hakkō' ("Corona", 白光) in October 1943, renamed Kyokkō in March 1944. Converted from P1Y1/P1Y1a. Fitted Mitsubishi MK4T-A Kasei 25 engines. Armed with 2 × 20 mm Type 99 cannons and 1 × 30 mm Type 5 cannon. Later, almost all were converted to P1Y2. 96 or 97 produced.
P1Y2 Provisional name Ginga Model 16 (仮称銀河16型, Kashō Ginga 16-gata)
 Land based bomber. Converted from P1Y2-S. Mounted 1,380 kW (1,850 hp) Mitsubishi MK4T-A Kasei 25 Kō engines.
P1Y2a Provisional name Ginga Model 16A (仮称銀河16甲型, Kashō Ginga 16 Kō-gata)
 Converted from P1Y1a. Mounted Mitsubishi MK4T-A Kasei 25 Kō engines.
P1Y2b Provisional name Ginga Model 16B (仮称銀河16乙型, Kashō Ginga 16 Otsu-gata)
 Converted from P1Y1b. Mounted Mitsubishi MK4T-A Kasei 25 Kō engines.
P1Y2c Provisional name Ginga Model 16C (仮称銀河16丙型, Kashō Ginga 16 Hei-gata)
 Converted from P1Y1c. Mounted Mitsubishi MK4T-A Kasei 25 Kō engines.
P1Y2 Ginga Model 16 Night-fighter variant (銀河16型改造夜戦, Ginga 16-gata Kaizō yasen)
 Converted from P1Y2. Armed with 2 × 20 mm Type 99 machine guns or 1 × 30 mm Type 5 cannon. Equipped 302nd Kōkūtai only. This is not a naval regulation equipment.
P1Y3 Provisional name Ginga Model 13 (仮称銀河13型, Kashō Ginga 13-gata)
 Converted from P1Y1. Mounted Homare 21 engines.
P1Y4 Provisional name Ginga Model 12 (仮称銀河12型, Kashō Ginga 12-gata)
 Converted from P1Y1. Mounted Homare 23 engines.
P1Y5 Provisional name Ginga Model 14 (仮称銀河14型, Kashō Ginga 14-gata)
 Converted from P1Y1. Mounted Mitsubishi Ha-43 engines.
P1Y6 Provisional name Ginga Model 17 (仮称銀河17型, Kashō Ginga 17-gata)
 Converted from P1Y2. Mounted Mitsubishi MK4T-C Kasei 25 Hei engines.Provisional name Ginga Model 33 (仮称銀河33型, Kashō Ginga 33-gata)
 Long-range bomber variant. Crew: 4, bombs= up to 3,000 kg. Only a project.
Test production Tenga (試製天河, Shisei Tenga)
Proposed jet-powered bomber variant, mounted Ishikawajima Ne-30. Discontinued in 1945.
MXY10 Yokosuka Navy Bomber Ginga Ground decoy non-flying replica of Yokosuka P1Y1.

Number built by Nakajima and Kawanishi

Operators

Imperial Japanese Navy Air ServiceThe Maru Mechanic (1984), p. 110Famous Airplanes of the World (2000), p. 32–38
 302nd Kōkūtai: Equipped night fighter variant only.
 521st Kōkūtai
 522nd Kōkūtai
 523rd Kōkūtai
 524th Kōkūtai
 701st Kōkūtai
 706th Kōkūtai
 752nd Kōkūtai
 761st Kōkūtai
 762nd Kōkūtai
 763rd Kōkūtai
 765th Kōkūtai
 1001st Kōkūtai
 1081st Kōkūtai
 Miyazaki Kōkūtai
 Toyohashi Kōkūtai
 Yokosuka Kōkūtai
 Kogeki 262nd Hikōtai
 Kogeki 401st Hikōtai
 Kogeki 405th Hikōtai
 Kogeki 406th Hikōtai
 Kogeki 501st Hikōtai
 Kogeki 708th Hikōtai

Specifications (P1Y1a)

See also

References

Notes

Bibliography

Further reading

 The Maru Mechanic No. 46 Ginga and Type 1 Attack Bomber, Ushio Shobō (Japan), May 1984
 Famous Airplanes of the World, Special Edition Vol. 1 Navy Bomber "Ginga" [Frances], Bunrindo (Japan), September 2000
 Model Art No. 406, Special issue Camouflage & Markings of Imperial Japanese Navy Bombers in W.W.II, Model Art Co. Ltd., April 1993
 Model Art No. 595, Special issue Night fighters of the Imperial Japanese Army and Navy'', Model Art Co. Ltd., October 2001

P1Y
P1Y, Yokosuka
P1Y, Yokosuka
P1Y
Mid-wing aircraft
Aircraft first flown in 1943
Twin piston-engined tractor aircraft